Round Island is an island in Poole Harbour in the English county of Dorset. It lies just off the shore of the Arne Peninsula in the south-west of the harbour, and is separated from the nearby uninhabited Long Island by a narrow channel only a few feet wide.

The island is 15 acres in size, being a private property with a mix of grassy paddocks and woodland.

Round Island lies within the civil parish of Corfe Castle. The parish forms part of the Purbeck local government district.

References

External links

Islands of Dorset
Poole Harbour
Corfe Castle